Israel competed at the 2015 World Championships in Athletics in Beijing, China, from 22–30 August 2015.

Hanna Knyazyeva-Minenko made a big improvement to her own National Record of her new country Israel with a 14.78. Her lead lasted through two jumpers before Ibargüen took the lead with her second round 14.80. Knyazyeva-Minenko's medal was the first World Championship medal for an Israeli woman.

Medalists 
The following competitors from Israel won medals at the Championships

Results
(q – qualified, NM – no mark, SB – season best)

Men
Track and road events

Field events

Women 
Track and road events

Field events

References 

Nations at the 2015 World Championships in Athletics
World Championships in Athletics
Israel at the World Championships in Athletics